Masazır (also, Masazyr and Masazir) is a settlement and municipality in the Absheron District of Azerbaijan.  It has a population of 3,247. It lies on the Lake Massasyr-Gel . 
The terrain around Masazyr is flat towards the northeast, but towards the southwest it is hilly. The highest point nearby is Şabandağ, 354 meters above sea level, 8.0 km south of Masazyr. Around Masazyr it is densely populated, with 982 inhabitants per square kilometer. The nearest larger community is Baku, 16.2 km southeast of Masazyr. In the area around Masazyr there are unusually many named mountains. 
The surroundings around Masazyr are essentially an open bush landscape.  Climate in the area is temperate. Average annual temperature in the neighborhood is 17 °C . The warmest month is August, when the average temperature is 30 °C, and the coldest is December, at 6 °C.  Average annual rainfall is 477 millimeters. The rainy month is November, with an average of 83 mm rainfall, and the driest is August, with 6 mm rainfall.

References 

Populated places in Absheron District